In geometry, the isotomic conjugate of a point  with respect to a triangle  is another point, defined in a specific way from  and : If the base points of the lines  on the sides opposite  are reflected about the midpoints of their respective sides, the resulting lines intersect at the isotomic conjugate of .

Construction

Let  be the points in which the lines  meet sidelines  (extended if necessary). Reflecting  in the midpoints of sides  will give points  respectively.

Coordinates

where  are the side lengths opposite vertices  respectively.

Properties
The isotomic conjugate of the centroid of triangle  is the centroid itself.

The isotomic conjugate of the symmedian point is the third Brocard point, and the isotomic conjugate of the Gergonne point is the Nagel point.

Isotomic conjugates of lines are circumconics, and conversely, isotomic conjugates of circumconics are lines.  (This property holds for isogonal conjugates as well.)

See also 
 Isogonal conjugate
 Triangle center

References 
 Robert Lachlan, An Elementary Treatise on Modern Pure Geometry, Macmillan and Co., 1893, page 57.
 Roger A. Johnson: Advanced Euclidean Geometry. Dover 2007, pp. 157–159, 278

External links

 Pauk Yiu: Isotomic and isogonal conjugates
 Navneel Singhal: Isotomic and isogonal conjugates

Triangle geometry

zh:等角共轭